Callum Watson (born 2 April 1997) is an Australian pianist, composer and producer.

Life 
Watson was born in Melbourne in 1997. As a recipient of the Victorian Curriculum and Assessment Authority Margaret Schofield Scholarship in 2015, he graduated in 2018 with a Bachelor of Music degree from Monash University studying with Mary Finsterer, Paul Grabowsky, Thomas Reiner and conductor Jobst Liebrecht.

His theatre score Caliban, composed during his 2016 Composer in Residence position at Western Edge Arts was produced in partnership with Malthouse Theatre featuring an ethnically diverse cast.

In 2018, celebrating the 340th anniversary of Antonio Vivaldi, Watson produced a CD release called Echoes of Earth. The release includes piano trio works by Watson and a new arrangement by Scott A. Aschauer of Vivaldi's La Notte from Six Flute Concertos, Op. 10. The recording is held at the National Film and Sound Archive in Canberra.

In 2019, Watson represented Australia at the 25th International Young Composers Meeting.

Works 
Selected works include:

 Colours of Conflict (2017) (premiered by Melbourne Symphony Orchestra)
 Caliban (2016)

References 

Notes
Sources

External links 
 Official homepage

Living people
1997 births
Musicians from Melbourne
Monash University alumni
Australian pianists
Contemporary classical composers
Australian record producers
Australian male classical composers
21st-century classical composers
Male pianists
21st-century pianists
21st-century Australian male musicians
21st-century Australian musicians